Hücü (also, Hüzü, Gidzhu, and Gudzhu) is a village in the Lerik Rayon of Azerbaijan.

References 

Populated places in Lerik District